Ásgeir R. Helgason (born 1957) is an Icelandic scientist working at Karolinska Institutet in Sweden. Since 2002 he has been an associate professor in psychology at the Departments of Oncology-Pathology and Public Health at the Karolinska Institutet and Reykjavik University, Iceland.

He is best known for his population based research on sexual function and emotional isolation in elderly men and prostate cancer patients, patient trade-off and his work on smoking cessation and quitlines. Helgason was a prime mover in the establishment of the Swedish and Icelandic national quitlines for smoking cessation (1998) and responsible for their development. He was also engaged in the development of a similar telephone based proactive treatment for people who seek help for controlling their alcohol consumption (alcohol quitline).

Other work includes research on motivational interviewing and palliative care
Followed by an ethical analysis of facilitating death talk in end-of-life care

Ásgeir has two sons, Hugi and Muni, after Odin's ravens Huginn and Muninn. His  brother-in-law is writer and humorist Tim Moore, his father is scientist Helgi Valdimarsson and he is a brother of scientist Agnar Helgason.

References and sources

PhD thesis (1997): Prostate Cancer Treatment and Quality of Life – a Three Level Epidemiological Approach
Sexual function in middle aged and elderly men: 
Emotional isolation in elderly men: 
Smoking cessation - quitlines: 
SvD - on emotional isolation (Swedish): 
Aftonbladet - on emotional isolation (Swedish): 
DN - on oral tobacco (Swedish): 
DN debatt (Swedish)Samtal om döden/Death talk
List of scientific publications at US National Library of Medicine National Institutes of Health 
Death talk

1957 births
Asgeir Helgason
Asgeir Helgason
Asgeir Helgason
Living people